Sebastien De Maio (born 5 March 1987) is a French professional footballer who plays as a centre-back for Italian  club Modena on loan from Vicenza. Aside from France, he has played in Italy and Belgium.

Career
Born in Saint-Denis, De Maio grew up in Nancy youth team, and in the summer of 2006 he was acquired by Brescia. He made his professional debut on 17 June 2007, in a 2–0 defeat to Rimini.

On 24 January 2019, Di Maio joined Udinese on loan from Bologna for the rest of the season. Udinese confirmed on 29 May 2019, that they had redeemed the player and he would remain at the club, penning a new three-year contract with the club.

On 13 January 2022, he moved to Serie B club Vicenza on a 2.5-year contract. On 28 July 2022, De Maio was loaned to Modena, with an option to buy.

Career statistics

References

External links

Living people
1987 births
Sportspeople from Saint-Denis, Seine-Saint-Denis
French sportspeople of Italian descent
Black French sportspeople
Association football defenders
French footballers
Serie A players
Serie B players
Belgian Pro League players
Brescia Calcio players
Frosinone Calcio players
Genoa C.F.C. players
R.S.C. Anderlecht players
ACF Fiorentina players
Bologna F.C. 1909 players
Udinese Calcio players
L.R. Vicenza players
Modena F.C. 2018 players
French expatriate footballers
French expatriate sportspeople in Italy
Expatriate footballers in Italy
French expatriate sportspeople in Belgium
Expatriate footballers in Belgium
Footballers from Seine-Saint-Denis